Nikoloz Kheladze (born 30 May 1972) is a professional Georgian footballer.

Career
Since 1990 he has played in the Georgian Premier League for Torpedo Kutaisi and Magaroeli Chiatura. In 1991 he became a bronze medalist of the Georgian championship.

In 1994 he joined the Ukrainian team Desna Chernihiv. In the T-shirt of the Chernihiv club on April 29, 1994, in the lost (2: 3) away match of the 28th round of the First League against Mukachevo "Carpathians". Nikoloz came on the field in the starting lineup, and in the 46th minute he was replaced by Yuri Melashenko. The Georgian goalkeeper failed to gain a foothold in Desna. From the end of April to the beginning of May 1994 he played 2 matches in the First League of Ukraine. During the 1994–95 season he returned to Torpedo. In 1997 he played for the Russian club Angusht Nazran.

References

External links
Nikoloz Kheladze at Footballfact.ru

1972 births
Living people
Footballers from Georgia (country)
Expatriate footballers from Georgia (country)
Erovnuli Liga players
FC Desna Chernihiv players
FC Torpedo Kutaisi players
FC Angusht Nazran players
Expatriate footballers in Ukraine
Expatriate sportspeople from Georgia (country) in Ukraine
Association football goalkeepers
Ukrainian Premier League players
Ukrainian First League players